The 2002–03 British Collegiate American Football League season was the 18th full season of the BCAFL, organised by the British Students American Football Association (BSAFA, now the BAFA).

Changes from last season
Divisional Changes
Northern Conference, Scottish Division was renamed Borders Division

Team Changes
David Chorley Bullets changed their name back to Bristol Bullets
Hull Sharks changed their name to UCH Sharks
Kent Falcons changed their name to UKC Falcons
Lancaster Bombers moved within the Northern Conference from Borders to Eastern Division
Leicester Lemmings changed their name to Lightning
Newcastle Mariners changed their name to Newcastle Raiders, and moved within the Northern Conference from Eastern to Borders Division
Strathclyde Hawks withdrew after sixteen seasons
University of Sunderland rejoined the Northern Conference after three seasons away, as the Kings
Teesside Cougars changed their name to UT Cougars
This meant the number of teams in BCAFL stayed at 29.

Regular season

Northern Conference, Borders Division

Northern Conference, Eastern Division

Northern Conference, Central Division

Southern Conference, Eastern Division

Southern Conference, Central Division

Southern Conference, Western Division

Playoffs

Note – the table does not indicate who played home or away in each fixture.

References

External links
 Official BUAFL Website
 Official BAFA Website

2002
2003 in British sport
2002 in British sport
2003 in American football
2002 in American football